is a series of self-defense oriented katas in judo. The series is composed of 8 techniques from a kneeling posture (idori waza), and 12 techniques from a standing position (tachi waza). Both sets of techniques contain defenses for both armed and empty-handed attacks.

Kneeling techniques (idori waza)

Ryote-dori (両手取)
Tsukkake (突掛)
Suri-age (摺上)
Yoko-uchi (横打)
Ushiro-dori (後取)
Tsukkomi (突込)
Kiri-komi (切込)
Yoko-tsuki (横突)

Standing techniques (tachi waza)
Ryote-dori (両手取)
Sode-tori (袖取)
Tsukkake (突掛)
Tsuki-age (突上)
Suri-age (摺上)
Yoko-uchi (横打)
Ke-age (蹴上)
Ushiro-dori (後取)
Tsuki-komi (突込)
Kiri-komi (切込)
Nuki-kake (抜掛)
Kiri-oroshi (切下)

External links 
 More Information on the Kata.

Judo kata